The Bots Master is a 1993 cartoon series, produced by Jean Chalopin through his company "Créativité et Développement" ("C&D") in France (where the show was known as Le Maître des Bots) and Saban International.  In total 40 episodes were made, each one having a special 3D segment and titles. The series was co-produced by Avi Arad and Associates. The show also had a toyline based on it.

Summary
In the year 2025 A.D., robots have become commonplace, performing menial tasks and working in industry. For that, the world can thank the young genius robotic engineer Ziv "ZZ" Zulander and the Robotic Megafact Corporation (aka RM Corp) he works for. Ziv's creation of the "3A robot series" revolutionized the world and its application of robotics. However, Sir Lewis Leon Paradim (aka "LLP", president of RM Corp) isn't satisfied being one of the wealthiest men in the world; he desires world domination. With his assistants Lady Frenzy and Dr. Hiss, LLP plans to take control of the planet through a coup, using the very same 3A bots that ZZ had invented to benefit humanity. Dr. Hiss creates a new chip, called the "Krang Chip", which can be used to override any 3A series robot to take orders exclusively from RM Corp. ZZ learns of LLP's evil plan and decides to defect from the company, intending to stop the continued manufacture and distribution of the Krang Chips.

LLP and his cohorts originally seek to capture ZZ and attempt to convince him to switch sides, but ZZ refuses. Utilizing his A.I. robotic creations, the B.O.Y.Z.Z. (Brain Operated Young Zygoetopic Zoids), Zulander stages a robotic guerrilla war against RM Corps' military bots. Shortly after escaping RM Corp, ZZ rescues his sister Blitzy Zulander and takes his home and operation literally underground to avoid enemy detection. After securing his base of operations, ZZ and his BOYZZ begin their private campaign against RM Corp.

ZZ had secretly installed a special system, called "mirrors", which allows him to monitor RM Corp from within Lady Frenzy's office PC, using this information to sabotage RM Corp plans. During attempts to foil Krang Chip delivery and production, ZZ and his BOYZZ are incriminated in a series of false media reports on his rogue activities to turn public sympathy against him, and discrediting his heroic efforts as terrorism activity.

Characters

Humans

The Zulanders
 Ziv "ZZ" Zulander (voiced by Mark Hildreth) - "The Bots Master" of the title, a freedom fighter and creator/leader of the Boyzz Brigade. Ziv formerly worked for RM Corp where he developed robots until he discovered what RM Corp secretly planned to do with them. A master of disguise and an excellent mimic, as well as a capable fighter. He has a number of technological devices built into his combat suit: anti-gravity boots and a paralyzing beam in his left forearm, but lacks the battery power for sustained use. He is somewhat of a ladies' man. Apparently able to play lead guitar and sing - or finger-and-lip-synch convincingly enough - when disguised as a rock star ("Rock the Corp"). He tries to avoid civilian casualties and thus tends to plan toward commando raids rather than outright combat as the series progresses. Ziv has the family trait of a lethal allergic reaction to the pollen of a particular cactus (as seen in "Flowers for ZZ"). He is enamored by Lady Frenzy despite her attempts to poison him. Both he and sister Blitzy are originally from Santa Marta, a blue-collar factory-based town apparently some distance from Mega City (as seen in "ZZ Come Back"). He is one of the only two characters who appears in all forty episodes of the series, the other being Blitzy.
 Blitzy "Blitz" Zulander (voiced by Crystaleen O'Bray) - Ziv's impulsive 10-year-old sister. She tries to aid her older brother in his missions, often in the capacity of supporting fire. Though not as talented a creator as ZZ, she still proves able to assemble the Jungle Fiver modular robot with Genesix' help. She is capable of driving but prefers to fly the VAF jet with its heavier artillery. Blitzy tends to solve tactical problems on impulse, using force rather than guile - usually, by the time it is necessary for her to act, the situation has rendered guile ineffective. She shares ZZ's lethal allergy to a certain cactus pollen.  She is the only other character besides ZZ who appears in all forty episodes of the series.

RM Corp
RM Corp is an organization that specializes in robotics.  Ziv works there before defecting.
 Sir Lewis Leon Paradim (voiced by Dale Wilson) - The main villain of the series. Sir Lewis Leon Paradim (or LLP for short) is the bald-headed CEO of RM Corp vows to take over the world through Krang Chips in the first half of the series, then seeks to become World President in the second half, all while attempting to discredit and destroy ZZ's heroic efforts. He is crafty enough to send a bomb-equipped robot duplicate of himself to his own birthday celebration, knowing that ZZ will be there (as seen in "Rock the Corp"). LLP also has considerable fighting skills of his own in "A Tale of Two Paradims" where he manages to fend off Ninjzz with fisticuffs and pushes Ninjzz to the ground.
 Dr. Hiss (voiced by Ian James Corlett) - The Corp's resident cyborg mad scientist who speaks with a lisp, and chief creator of the Corps' bots. His faith in said bots is high, and though they are destroyed on a regular basis, he becomes visibly dismayed upon learning that the Krang Chip-equipped 3A can be hacked (as seen in "You Can Bank On It"). Hiss has a personal hatred for ZZ, generally attempting to kill him outright with overwhelming firepower (but halting within range of media witnesses - "Lost"). Hiss often personally engages in battles, yet the Boyzz Brigade try to avoid injuring him. His name and personality could be references to the Nazi politician Rudolf Hess.
 Lady Frenzy (voiced by Janyse Jaud) - Paradim's second-in-command who holds romantic feelings for ZZ which sometimes conflict with her loyalties to LLP and the Corp. She doesn't share Dr. Hiss' confidence in RM Corp's bots, and thus will generally attempt to negotiate or threaten before resorting to violence. As fitting to her position, she has a far cooler mind than Hiss.

Other human characters
 Lonnie Chang - News reporter and anchor. The primary source of ZZ's bad press, although she doesn't seem to consider him a threat in person, getting within interviewing distance of him at one point ("Lost").  It is even revealed through her daughter, Rebecca (who appears in the episode "Building Eight"), that she has steadily grown more and more skeptical of ZZ being a terrorist throughout the series.  Based on Connie Chung, if only in name.
 Alicia - Seeing that ZZ appears lonely, the Boyzz Brigade set him up with a model named Alicia, and they genuinely seem to like one another. Their first date ends somewhat disastrously because of the Corp, but Alicia is willing to see ZZ again, despite being aware of the dangers that come from being associated with him. However, Lady Frenzy learns about Alicia's relationship with ZZ and takes advantage of their resemblance to set up a trap for ZZ. Alicia makes an appearance again during ZZ's birthday and seems to have an on-off romantic relationship with him.
 President Bando - The President of Africa, who is a political opponent of LLP and is one of the few people on Earth who believes in ZZ.

Robots

The Boyzz Brigade
Short for "Brain Operated Young Zygoetopic Zoids," these robots are ZZ's allies against RM Corp.

 The Street Boyzz A duo of front-line construction worker-themed combatants that use construction-themed weapons. The Street Boyzz think of each other as brothers and are equipped with retractable roller-blades for quick movement.
 Jammerzz (voiced by Cusse Mankuma) - Has a large jackhammer for one arm, ending in twin laser cannons at the shoulder. He enjoys battering his opponents with his jackhammer and occasionally speaks in rhyme/rap.
 Toolzz (voiced by Stefano Giulianetti) - Uses a wrench and drill as weapons, often dismantling the opposition rather than destroying them. He also has a small laser cannon in his arm and dislikes heights.
 The Sports Boyzz Another team of front-line combatants that use sports-themed weapons.  They use their sports skills to lob, hit, kick, drive, smash, and otherwise launch sports-ball-type explosives at the opposition.
 All Ball - The leader of the Sports Boyzz, demonstrating expertise in volleyball and soccer. His wide-body design, while effective, gives him a comical running style.
 Batzz - Expert in baseball, and carries a bat. The most humanoid of the Sports Boyzz in appearance.  Batzz had the unenviable experience of crashing into a baseball light fixture and briefly losing his memory (as seen in "Lost").
 Bogey (voiced by Stefano Giulianetti) - Expert in golf. His single arm is a golf club. When piloting a vehicle, such as a Jungle Fiver component, he projects beams from his eyes to do so.
 Ace - Expert in tennis, and has a racket arm. Consequently, he pilots one-handed and is the only Sport Boyzz equipped with a laser.
 The Science Boyzz (Analysis-Type Bots) - Two scientist robots who serve as the group's research and development duo. They stay out of combat for the most part except for dire emergencies, and usually only leave the base for intelligence/reconnaissance purposes. They are sometimes called upon to pilot Jungle Fiver when the Sports Boyzz or Street Boyzz are unable to do so.
 D'Nerd (voiced by Terry Klassen) - A large data bank with a computer for a head. D'Nerd was occasionally brought out into the field in that capacity. Often replies to statements with the dictionary definitions of words. Notably forgot to put film into a camera before taking an important, incriminating video ("This Land Is My Land"). He was once captured and brought to LLP, who dismissed him as a talking dictionary.
 Genesix (voiced by Michael Donovan) - Creates most of the new vehicles and things for ZZ, often in the sense of being the one to actually build them. The engineer of the Boyzz Brigade, Genesix was the original Boyzz prototype and his name is a play on the word "genesis".
 Watzon - The team doctor and a dry wit. Makes repairs to the Boyzz, and administers medical aid to humans where required. Surprisingly fearless for his intended purpose, he dragged Cook along on a dangerous mission to save Ziv and Blitzy's lives while the other Boyzz were paralyzed without leadership ("Flowers For ZZ").
 Other Boyzz (Stand-Alone Bots) - These robots aren't grouped like the others.
 Cook the Cooking Boyzz (voiced by Samuel Vincent) - A chef robot that usually stays at the base and cooks for the Zulanders. He speaks with a French accent. One field mission he was in was where he assisted Watzon in coming up with an antidote to the pollen for a particular cactus that ZZ and Blitzy are allergic to ("Flowers For ZZ").
 Ninjzz the Ninja Boyzz (voiced by Surya Kellar) - A ninja robot who is the first Boyzz to be built during the show and the only one specifically built for combat. ZZ modeled Ninjzz's electronic brain on the greatest martial artists on Earth, making Ninjzz formidable in hand-to-hand combat. He prefers to fight with his sword or nunchaku, but sometimes uses a hand-held laser gun. In "Flowers for ZZ", he took over leadership of the Boyzz while ZZ and Blitzy were incapacitated.
 Kiddie the Child Boyzz - Designed possibly to serve as a playmate for Blitzy. Kiddie behaves like a young boy but does help out on missions occasionally. Kiddie behaves much like a younger sibling, and tends to annoy Blitzy from time to time.
 Momzz the Mother Boyzz - She was only present for one episode when Genesix felt ZZ and Blitzy needed a mother. She was thought to have been destroyed during a suicide run to save everyone else. However, she turned out to be alive in the end.
 Swang the Bug Boyzz - Acts as a reconnaissance and distractions specialist. Moves by hopping. Cannot speak normally, instead communicating with synthesized chirps which the other Boyzz Brigade (ZZ and Blitzy included) can understand.
 Twig - The largest Boyzz and ZZ's bodyguard. Twig is designed to function with ZZ's car, able to transform into a robot or fly when his master is in danger. He can also detach from his car components when not out on a mission, so he can fit inside the base. Twig is also very well armed and often aids in frontal assaults when maximum firepower is needed.
 The Talking Heads - The Talking Heads (or "T-Heads") are a group of robot heads built by Genesix that sit on a shelf in ZZ's house. They usually just comment on goings-on but occasionally are put to work helping the other Boyzz (such as in the episode "Flowers for ZZ"). Even though they are mostly immobile (they can turn toward one another), their positions on the shelf rearrange from episode to episode. Individually they are known as:
 T1 - A talking green robot head with fins.
 T2 - A pink robot head that laughs a lot.
 T3 - A rectangular purple robot head.
 T4 - A green robot head with eyestalks.
 T5 - A gold-colored robot head.
 Birden and Freehand - These bots aid the team by acting as decoys against the Corp's Security Bots. Birden is a robot bird built by Genesix, but he was too busy to build an accurate navigation system causing Birden to fly around randomly and cause havoc. Freehand is basically an arm attached to a rotor that flies around ZZ's house, usually enacting tasks for the Talking Heads.
 Jungle Fiver - The Boyzz Brigade's most powerful weapon. A group of five vehicles that can transform into robots and also combine into a heavily armed giant robotic fighting machine. It is generally considered to be the one element of the Boyzz Brigade mainly under Blitzy's command, while ZZ takes command of the remainder of the brigade. The individual vehicles and Jungle Fiver appear to have some sort of autopilot, but are usually (more so as the series progressed) piloted by the Boyzz or the Zulanders. Jungle Fiver usually engages the Corp's MDBs and is treated as a 'trump card' by the Boyzz Brigade. The combination itself is password-protected at one point (which was 'zucchini' as seen in "Flowers for ZZ"), possibly related to Blitzy yelling, "Jungle Fiver, Combine!" when it combines. The name is a pun on the phrase "jungle fever." Jungle Fiver is upgraded later in the series to be capable of trans-lunar space travel, but is otherwise capable of atmospheric flight. Its biggest weakness is its combined size: civilian airport radar can easily spot it (as seen in "Lost").
 Half Bot - An ATV-type robot.
 Jet Bot - A jet-type robot.
 Tank Bot - A tank-type robot.
 Heli Bot - A helicopter-type robot.
 Hover Bot - A hovercraft-type robot.

The Boyzz Brigade also have a number of other vehicles, including a "mole" digger, a stealth submarine (invisible to radar/sonar, but visually identifiable), and the Splitvan (a van that can divide into multiple smaller vehicles). Blitzy is especially fond of her VAF, a sort of attack jet with GERWALK-capable 'legs'.

There are also other bots under ZZ's command, known only as "Battle Bots".

RM Corp Bots (3A type)
Although the RM Corp's bots are devoid of personality (and universally speak in the same monotone synthesized voice), there are a few common types.

 3P - An enormous green robot that serves as power booster bot for "MDB" (see below).
 Beast Bot - A special-purpose canine-like robot designed by Dr. Hiss to track and locate Ziv Zulander due to his DNA signature. 
 Green Bot - Green Bots are the Corp's standard soldier robots. They have stronger armor than Security Bots and are better armed, with a laser cannon on one arm and a set of pincers on the other, but behave in the same manner.
 Humabot - Humabots are mercenary cyborg soldiers that work for the Corp in exchange for robotic upgrades that give them enhanced strength and durability. 
 Massive Destruction Bot - The Massive Destruction Bot (or MDB) is a class of robot that is one of Dr. Hiss's creations.  Although there are several variants, the original prototype was nicknamed "Goliath".  MDBs do not speak and usually require the Zulanders to deploy Jungle Fiver to do battle.
 Private Police Bot - Also known as "P.P.B.", these well-armed robots featuring black and purple armor are a more advanced version of the Green Bot and are usually used for the personal protection of Corp staffers but are occasionally dispatched for open combat when needed.
 Security Bot - Security Bots are the most common opposition ZZ and the Boyzz Brigade encounter in the first half of the series. Designed to monitor and patrol restricted areas, they have security cameras for heads and exposed joints which the Boyzz, especially Toolzz, frequently exploit for dismantling.

Episodes

Cast
 Ian James Corlett - Dr. Hiss
 Richard Ian Cox - 
 Michael Donovan - Genesix
 Stefano Giulianetti - Toolzz, Bogie
 Mark Hildreth - Ziv "ZZ" Zulander
 Janyse Jaud - Lady Frenzy
 Surya Kellar - Ninjzz
 Terry Klassen - D'Nerd
 Rob Lehane - 
 Cusse Mankuma - Jammerzz
 Pamela Martin - 
 Crystaleen O'Bray - Blitzy Zulander
 Kim Restell - 
 Chelan Simmons - 
 Samuel Vincent - Cook
 Dale Wilson - Sir Lewis Leon Paradim

Crew
 Doug Parker - Voice Director

Title Translations
 The Bots Master (English)
 El Amo de los Robots (Spanish)
 Le Maître des bots (French)
 Bots Master (Italian)
 أبطال الليزر (Arabic)
 보츠마스터 (Korean)

Lazer Time
In addition to the credits, every episode of the show had a short segment in 3D. Using a method called the Pulfrich effect, the segment was acceptable for viewers with or without the special glasses packaged with action figures based on the series. To inform viewers to wear their glasses, a character - usually Zulander - would shout, "Lazer Time, boyzz!" followed by an image of the 3-D glasses on the screen. Once the 3-D sequence was over, ZZ would call "Game Over!" and an image of the 3-D glasses appear once more on the screen, this time with a no symbol superimposed over it. For the Bots Master series the effect was produced by Nuoptix 3-D.

Merchandise
In conjunction with the series, a short-lived toyline was produced under license by C&D. The line included action figures of Ziv Zulander, Doctor Hiss, and Jungle Fiver before being discontinued.

Home Video
Six VHS tapes were released in the 1990s, each with a single episode and the title of that episode.

References

External links
 

1990s French animated television series
1993 French television series debuts
1994 French television series endings
French children's animated action television series
Fictional robots
Animated television series about robots
YTV (Canadian TV channel) original programming
Television series set in the 2020s
English-language television shows
Television series by Saban Entertainment